Edmonton Opera is a professional Canadian opera company in Edmonton, Alberta, which performs in the Northern Alberta Jubilee Auditorium with its Opera Centre located at 15230 128 Ave in northwest Edmonton. The Opera Centre is home to a box office, production shops, costume storage, and a Jubilee stage-sized rehearsal hall. It celebrated its 50th anniversary during the 2013/14 season.

History 
Approximately six amateur opera companies pre-date the Edmonton Opera’s founding in 1963. After Mrs. J.B. Carmichael’s death in 1964, singers who had been involved with the Edmonton Operatic Society approached local pianist and voice teacher Jean Letourneau about working with them. After a number of successful productions, the group changed its name to the Edmonton Professional Opera Association, with David Ker as the first president and Letourneau as the music director. "Professional" was dropped from the company’s name in August 1966, as the then-artistic director, Irving Guttman, argued that it should be obvious to all if a company is professional.

The first season, 1963/64, featured two productions: Madama Butterfly  in October 1963, and Cavalleria Rusticana and Pagliacci in April 1964. In 1966, Letourneau convinced Guttman, then at the Vancouver Opera, to come to Edmonton. The artistic director from 1966 to 1998, Guttman would be a part of all four Western Canadian opera companies — Vancouver (founded 1958), Edmonton (founded 1963), Manitoba (founded 1969) and Calgary (founded 1972).

Until 2008, the opera guild was one of many forms of support for the opera. Founded by Thelma Gregg, the group held many successful fundraisers and ensured everyone backstage was well-fed.

Productions 
Usually, three productions make up one season; though at the beginning, a season usually comprised two productions, and as many as five operas have been presented in one season, notably in 1992/93 and 1993/94.

Repertoire includes the classic operatic works, as well as a handful of more contemporary pieces, especially in more recent years. The 2013/14 season will be the third time Salome has been seen in Edmonton, the fourth time for Die Fledermaus and the eighth time for Madama Butterfly  — since it was the first piece presented in 1963, Puccini’s work is usually revisited near major anniversaries for Edmonton Opera. More contemporary works include Of Mice and Men (2001/02), Weil in Weimar (2004/05), Filumena (2005/06), Bluebeard’s Castle (2005/06), and Lilies (Les Feluettes) (2017/18). In 2012/13, the ATB Canadian Series comprised the world premiere of Shelter, co-produced with Tapestry New Opera, and Svadba – Wedding, produced by Queen of Puddings Music Theatre.

Education 
With the aid of technology, the company is able to share operatic resources across northern Alberta, including educational guides, programs and other resources. Field trips for students in Edmonton are arranged for the second dress rehearsal, when they can visit the Northern Alberta Jubilee, watch the performance, and often, chorus and cast members come out to the lobby to chat during intermissions.

Between 1973 and 1984, Edmonton Opera on Tour brought opera to children in schools across Alberta, from bigger centres such as Grande Prairie to smaller communities such as Holden. Through this program, there were approximately 200 performances per year.

Community 
The Edmonton Opera has partnered with many other arts organizations in Edmonton, including the Alberta Craft Council and the Shumka Ukrainian Dancers. The Edmonton Opera is also the largest employer of the Edmonton Symphony Orchestra.

References 

Canadian opera companies
Musical groups from Edmonton
Musical groups established in 1963
1963 establishments in Alberta